Samand Aliyevich Siabandov (20 November 1909 – 14 November 1989) was a Soviet writer, military officer and politician of Yezidi-Kurdish origin who was awarded the title Hero of the Soviet Union during the Soviet war against Nazi Germany.

Siabandov joined the Communist Party of the Soviet Union in 1931 and in 1938 was elected deputy in the Supreme Soviet of the Armenian Soviet Socialist Republic. Later he was a Minister of Agriculture for the Armenian SSR. After World War II he was elected to the Supreme Soviet of the Soviet Union. 

He was the author of two published poems in the Kurdish language and an Armenian-Kurdish dictionary.

Honours and awards
 Hero of the Soviet Union (24 March 1945)
 Order of Lenin (24 March 1945)
 Two Order of the Red Banner(1 August 1943 and 27 July 1944)
 Three Order of the Patriotic War (1st class - 19 February 1945 and 6 April 1985; 2nd class - 30 November 43)
 Order of the Red Star (9 July 1942)
 Two Order of the Badge of Honour
 Medal For Courage (22 January 1942)

Published works 
 Siyabend û Xecê (Siyabend and Xecê) - (1959)
 Jiyana Bextewar (The happy life) - (1966)
 Ferhenga Ermenî-Kurdî (Armenian-Kurdish dictionary) - (1959)

References

1909 births
1989 deaths
People from Kars Oblast
Communist Party of the Soviet Union members
Heroes of the Soviet Union
Kurdish-language writers
Recipients of the Order of Lenin
Recipients of the Order of the Red Banner
Recipients of the Medal "For Courage" (Russia)
Soviet military personnel of World War II
Soviet politicians
Soviet writers
Kurds in Armenia
Armenian Yazidis
Second convocation members of the Supreme Soviet of the Soviet Union
Fourth convocation members of the Supreme Soviet of the Soviet Union